The Meta Network (TMN) is a free online community that describes itself as being "dedicated to learning and creative freedom". Founded on March 28, 1983, by Frank Burns, TMN was one of the first, public online communities. TMN was one of the consortium of online communities and networks that banded together to form the Electronic Networking Association in 1985.

Moderation and organization
The community forums, known as Conferences are supervised by conference hosts who guide conversations and may enforce conference rules on civility and/or appropriateness. All hosts are selected by TMN moderators.

Overall support and supervision of the conferencing services is by core unpaid members, often referred to collectively, as conference organizers. Conference organizers have more system operational powers than conference hosts, along with the additional social authority of selecting featured conference hosts and (rarely) closing accounts for abuse.

TMN requires registration and use of one's real name.  TMN can only be accessed by registered users. TMN members use a consistent login name when posting messages, and a non-fixed pseudonym field alongside it.  The pseudonym defaults to the user's real name, but can be changed at will but this is neither common nor is it encouraged. Although TMN is name based, the user's real name can be easily looked up using their login name. TMN members are not anonymous.

TMN is divided into general subject areas known as conferences, which reflect member interests. Within conferences, members open separate conversational threads called topics for specific items of interest. "Public" conferences are open to all members, while "private" conferences are restricted to a list of users controlled by the conference hosts. Some private conferences (such as "Spirit" for women and "Fire" for men) are listed in TMN's directory, but are access restricted for privacy or membership-restriction reasons. Members may request admission to such conferences. Membership in private conferences is by invitation. TMN members may open their own new public or private independent conferences.

External links
 The Meta Network
 Register for The Meta Network
 The Navigator - Live T R A N S C R I P T - Live chat interview with Frank Burns about TMN.COM
 Caucus open source software

Bulletin board systems
Internet forums
History of the Internet
Pre–World Wide Web online services